Axenfeld or Aksenfeld may refer to:

Israel Aksenfeld (aka Israel Axenfeld / Yisroel Aksenfeld, 1787-1866), a German writer
Karl Theodor Paul Polykarpus Axenfeld (1867-1930), a German ophthalmologist
Karl Theodor Georg Axenfeld (1869-1924), a German superintendent of the Kurmark
Edith Picht-Axenfeld (1914-2001), a German pianist and harpsichordist
Morax-Axenfeld diplobacilli, a bacterium
Axenfeld syndrome, a rare autosomal dominant disorder